William Smethergell (6 January 1751 - before March 1836) was an English composer and musician who lived and worked in London. Christened in the church of St Peter le Poer, after an apprenticeship of seven years, Smethergell became the organist of two London churches, All Hallows-by-the-Tower and St Mary-at-Hill, posts which he held simultaneously for fifty years. He was also the principal viola player at the Vauxhall Pleasure Gardens.

His surviving works include two published sets of symphonies, six harpsichord sonatas, seven keyboard concertos and a number of works for smaller forces. Timothy Rishton, writing about his life in 1983, notes that the early promise of his keyboard works, some of the first to be specified for pianoforte, is not fulfilled, and for the last thirty years of his life he wrote little (at least which survives).

References

External links
 

English composers
English organists
British male organists
1751 births
1836 deaths